"Still the One" is a song written by Johanna Hall and John Hall, and recorded by the soft rock group Orleans on their album Waking and Dreaming, released in 1976, which reached No. 5 on the Billboard Hot 100.

Country singer Bill Anderson recorded and released a successful cover version, peaking at No. 11 on Billboards Hot Country Singles chart in 1977.

Song lyrics
The lyrics of the uptempo love song are of someone (as the lyrics were written by a woman and sung by a man, it does not state the gender of the singer or of their beloved) describing their feelings for a person with whom they have a long-lasting relationship ("Now I want you to know / After all these years"); with trust ("You're still the one / I want whispering in my ears"); that they are close ("You're still the one / I want to talk to in bed"); find them attractive ("Still the one that turns my head"); and of an intimate or sexual nature ("You're still the one / Who can scratch my itch / You're still the one, that I with which") and all the reasons why their lover is "Still the One" for whom they have feelings.

Background
Orleans bass player Lance Hoppen recalls that Johanna Hall wrote the lyrics for "Still the One" after a friend "asked her why somebody couldn't write a song about staying together, as opposed to breaking up"; Johanna Hall wrote the lyrics on an envelope which she then handed to John Hall who Hoppen says "created the music in about fifteen minutes". Johanna Hall's recollection is that the realization that there was a dearth of songs about long-term relationships came to her while she was doing laundry, and that she handed John Hall a napkin on which she'd written the song's lyric. John Hall would recall that "Still the One" was not an automatic choice for lead single from Waking and Dreaming saying rather that "we had several songs that were candidates. We were too close to it to see. Fortunately, our producer, Chuck Plotkin, had a strong feeling about the song."

Record World said that it was a "suitable follow-up to 'Dance with Me'" and that "chiming guitars and confident harmony work are the ingredients to make it happen."

In popular culture
In 1977, "Still The One" was used as a jingle by the American Broadcasting Company (ABC) to promote the 1977-78 television season, and again in the 1979-80 television season, when the network was the highest rated in the country. The lyrics were sometimes adapted for local station promotional advertisements, sometimes awkwardly; e.g. "We're still having fun, Dayton Twenty-Two's the one."

The song was also used in adverts and promotions for the Nine Network of Australia (closely linked to ABC) from the late 1970s to the mid-2000s, and even though the song only charted at No. 61 in Australia in its original chart run, it is most remembered for its usage by the Nine Network. It was also used at EM TV in Papua New Guinea in the 1980s (at the time owned by the Nine Network) and by Sky Television in the United Kingdom.
In 2004, the Bush campaign played the song at campaign events until Orleans co-founder (and future Democratic congressman and Bush critic) John Hall commented publicly that the campaign had never received permission to use the song. The campaign later dropped the song from its playlist. Hall expressed similar criticisms when John McCain used the song in his 2008 presidential campaign. A version of the song's chorus was sung at the 2008 Democratic National Convention, following the conclusion of Senator Ted Kennedy's speech.

A remade version of the song has been used to promote Oklahoma City's Riverwind Casino throughout 2018-19.

The original version of the song appears in a 2020 TV commercial for Applebee's.

Charts

Weekly charts

Year-end charts

Bill Anderson version

"Still the One" was notably recorded by American country singer-songwriter Bill Anderson. It was released as a single in 1977 via MCA Records and became a major hit the following year.

Anderson's version was recorded on December 13, 1976 in Nashville, Tennessee. The session was produced by Buddy Killen, who recently became Anderson's producer after many years of working with Owen Bradley. Killen would continue producing Anderson until his departure from MCA Records. "Still the One" was the only song recorded during this particular session.

"Still the One" was released as a single by MCA Records in October 1977. The song spent 12 weeks on the Billboard Hot Country Singles before reaching number 11 in June 1977. The song was among Anderson's final major hits as a recording artist. His final top ten hit would be released in 1978, followed by his final top 20 release in 1979. In Canada, the single also reached the top 20, reaching number 13 on the RPM Country Songs chart in 1977. It was Anderson's second single that was a cover version of an original recording. His first was 1969's "But You Know I Love You", which reached the country top 10. It was first released on his 1977 studio album Scorpio, which also included the major hit "Head to Toe".7" vinyl single'
 "Still the One" – 3:20
 "This Ole Suitcase" – 4:14

Chart performance

References

1976 songs
1976 singles
1977 singles
Asylum Records singles
Bill Anderson (singer) songs
MCA Records singles
Orleans (band) songs
Song recordings produced by Chuck Plotkin
Songs written by John Hall (New York politician)